Neochori (meaning "new village") may refer to the following places:

Neochori Aristomenous, a village in the municipal unit of Messini, Messenia
Neochori Ithomis, a village in the municipal unit of Meligalas, Messenia
Neochori Mesolongiou, a village in the municipal unit of Oiniades, Aetolia-Acarnania
Neochori Nafpaktias, a village in the municipal unit of Platanos, Aetolia-Acarnania
Neochori Falaisias, a village in the municipal unit of Falaisia, Arcadia
Neochori Gortynias, a village in the municipal unit of Tropaia, Arcadia
Neochori Lykosouras, a village in the municipality of Megalopoli, Arcadia
Neochori Mantineias, a village in the municipal unit of Korythio, Arcadia
Neochori Ypatis, a village in the municipal unit of Ypati, Phthiotis
Neochori Tymfristou, a village in the municipal unit of Agios Georgios Tymfristou, Phthiotis
Neochori, Argolis, a village in the municipal unit of Lyrkeia, Argolis
Neochori, Arta, a village in the municipal unit of Arachthos, Arta regional unit
Neochori Thespion, a village in the municipal unit of Thespies, Boeotia
Neochori, Cephalonia, a village in the municipal unit of Erisos, Cephalonia
Neochori, Chalkidiki, a village in the municipal unit of Arnaia, Chalkidiki
Neochori, Chios, a village in the municipal unit of Agios Minas, Chios
Neochori, Corfu, a village in the municipal unit of Lefkimmi, Corfu
Neochori, Domokos, a village in the municipal unit of Domokos, Phthiotis
Neochori, Euboea, a village in the municipal unit of Avlon, Euboea
Neochori, Evros, a village in the municipality of Orestiada, Evros regional unit 
Neochori, Grevena, a village in the municipal unit of Ventzio, Grevena regional unit 
Neochori Myrtountion, a village in the municipal unit of Kastro-Kyllini, Elis
Neochori, Imathia, a village in the municipality of Alexandreia, Imathia 
Neochori, Ioannina, a village in the municipal unit of Pasaronas, Ioannina regional unit 
Neochori, Karditsa, a village in the municipal unit of Nevropoli Agrafon, Karditsa regional unit 
Neochori, Kerkini, a village in the municipal unit of Kerkini, Serres regional unit 
Neochori, Laconia, a village in the municipal unit of Gytheio, Laconia 
Neochori, Lefkada, a village in the municipal unit of Ellomenos, Lefkada
Neochori, Lefktro, a village in the municipal unit of Lefktro, Messenia
Neochori, Lesbos, a village in the municipal unit of Plomari, Lesbos 
Neochori, Magnesia, a village in the municipal unit of Afetes, Magnesia
Neochori, Samos, a village in the municipal unit of Marathokampos, Samos
Neochori Strymona, a village in the municipal unit of Strymonas, Serres regional unit 
Neochori, Thesprotia, a village in the municipal unit of Paramythia, Thesprotia
Neochori, Xanthi, a village in the municipal unit of Stavroupoli, Xanthi regional unit
Neochori, Zacharo, a village in the municipal unit of Zacharo, Elis

See also
 Neo Chorio